Ocean Township is a township located in east central Monmouth County, in the U.S. state of New Jersey. It is located on the Jersey Shore. The township is a bedroom suburb of New York City. Ocean Township consists of three main unincorporated communities: Wanamassa, Oakhurst, and Wayside. The township is divided into two ZIP codes, 07755 (Oakhurst) and 07712 (Wanamassa & Wayside, main city Asbury Park). Small portions have Allenhurst (07711), Deal (07723) and Long Branch (07740) ZIP codes.

As of the 2020 United States census, the township's population was 27,672, an increase of 381 (+1.4%) from the 2010 census count of 27,291, which in turn reflected an increase of 332 (+1.2%) from the 26,959 counted in the 2000 Census.

History
The township was created by an act of the New Jersey Legislature on February 21, 1849, from portions of Shrewsbury Township, at which time the newly formed township stretched from the Shrewsbury River to the southern tip of Avon-by-the-Sea. Portions of the township have been taken to form Long Branch (April 11, 1867), Eatontown (April 4, 1873), Asbury Park (March 26, 1874), Neptune Township (February 26, 1879), Sea Bright (March 21, 1889), Allenhurst (April 26, 1897), Deal (March 7, 1898), Monmouth Beach (March 9, 1906), Interlaken (March 11, 1922) and Loch Arbour (April 23, 1957). The township derives its name from its original seaside location.

Geography
According to the U.S. Census Bureau, the township had a total area of 10.99 square miles (28.47 km2), including 10.87 square miles (28.15 km2) of land and 0.13 square miles (0.32 km2) of water (1.14%).

Oakhurst (2010 Census population of 3,995) and Wanamassa (2010 population 4,532) are unincorporated communities and census-designated places (CDPs) located within Ocean Township.

Other unincorporated communities, localities and place names located partially or completely within the township include Cold Indian Spring Lake, Colonial Terrace, Deal Lake, Deal Park, Dogs Corners, Edgemere, Elberon Park, Green Grove, Indian Springs, Oakhurst Manor, Poplar, Shadow Lawn Manor, Wayside, Wertheins Corner, West Allenhurst and West Deal.

The township is bordered by the Monmouth County municipalities of Eatontown and West Long Branch on the north; Long Branch, Deal, Allenhurst and Interlaken on the east; Neptune and Asbury Park on the south; and Tinton Falls on the west.

Demographics

2010 census

The Census Bureau's 2006–2010 American Community Survey showed that (in 2010 inflation-adjusted dollars) median household income was $78,806 (with a margin of error of +/− $6,218) and the median family income was $100,682 (+/− $8,339). Males had a median income of $66,774 (+/− $6,581) versus $42,216 (+/− $5,707) for females. The per capita income for the borough was $40,432 (+/− $2,161). About 4.0% of families and 5.9% of the population were below the poverty line, including 3.8% of those under age 18 and 5.8% of those age 65 or over.

2000 census
As of the 2020 U.S. census, there were 26,959 people, 10,254 households, and 7,341 families residing in the township.  The population density was 2,443.3 people per square mile (943.7/km2).  There were 10,756 housing units at an average density of 974.8 per square mile (376.5/km2).  The racial makeup of the township was 84.48% White, 5.67% African American, 0.15% Native American, 6.27% Asian, 0.07% Pacific Islander, 1.58% from other races, and 1.92% from two or more races. Hispanic or Latino people of any race were 4.51% of the population.

There were 10,254 households, out of which 35.4% had children under the age of 18 living with them, 58.3% were married couples living together, 10.3% had a female householder with no husband present, and 28.4% were non-families. 24.0% of all households were made up of individuals, and 8.4% had someone living alone who was 65 years of age or older.  The average household size was 2.63 and the average family size was 3.14.

In the township, the population was spread out, with 25.5% under the age of 18, 6.7% from 18 to 24, 29.8% from 25 to 44, 25.9% from 45 to 64, and 12.1% who were 65 years of age or older.  The median age was 38 years. For every 100 females, there were 92.9 males.  For every 100 females age 18 and over, there were 89.6 males.

The median income for a household in the township was $62,058, and the median income for a family was $74,572. Males had a median income of $52,376 versus $35,439 for females. The per capita income for the township was $30,581. About 3.6% of families and 5.0% of the population were below the poverty line, including 6.1% of those under age 18 and 5.0% of those age 65 or over.

Parks and recreation
Ocean Township has five named parks. The largest, Joe Palaia Park (formerly the Deal Test Site), is the site of the Township's July 4 celebration, and the Italian American Association of the Township of Ocean's annual five-day festival. Ocean Township also contains Weltz Park, an undeveloped parcel of the Monmouth County Park System.

Ocean Township maintains a membership-based pool and tennis club for residents, with the pool open during the summer from Memorial Day to Labor Day.

Government

Local government 

Ocean Township operates within the Faulkner Act (formally known as the Optional Municipal Charter Law) under the Council-Manager form of government (Plan A), implemented based on the recommendations of a Charter Study Commission as of July 1, 1963. The township is one of 42 municipalities (of the 564) statewide that use this form of government. The Township Council is comprised of five members who are chosen at-large by the voters on a non-partisan basis to serve concurrent four-year terms of office in elections held as part of the May municipal election. At an annual reorganization meeting, the Township Council selects one of its members to serve as Mayor. The five-member Council sets policy and adopts local ordinances while the Council-appointed Township Manager oversees the day-to-day administration of the Township. The Mayor presides over the Council and, as a member, has a voice and a vote in its proceedings.

, members of the Township Council are Mayor Christopher P. Siciliano, Deputy Mayor John P. Napolitani Sr., Robert V. Acerra Sr., Margie Donlon and David Fisher, all serving concurrent terms of office ending on June 30, 2023.

In January 2017, John Napolitani was chosen to fill the seat vacated by Deputy Mayor William Garofalo when he resigned from office in December 2016; Napolitani will serve on an interim basis until the November 2017 general election, when voters will select a candidate to serve the balance of the term of office.

In the May 2015 municipal election, the One Ocean slate won, with incumbents William Garofalo, Richard Long, Donna Schepiga and Christopher P. Siciliano winning re-election together with Robert Acerra, who won his first term of office.

At its January 1, 2015, meeting, the Township Council chose Christopher Siciliano to fill the position of mayor that was vacated when William Larkin resigned from office the previous November after 24 years on the council and the previous 12 years as mayor. The council appointed Richard Long to fill Larkin's vacant council seat.

In October 2002, former mayor Terrance D. Weldon, who was also the city manager of Asbury Park, pleaded guilty in United States District Court for the District of New Jersey in Newark to taking $64,000 in bribes from developers. His arrest was part of the first phase of a federal investigation known as Operation Bid Rig. On August 25, 2007, after almost five years, Weldon was sentenced to 58 months of prison and assessed a fine of $20,000 by Senior U.S. District Judge William H. Walls.

Federal, state and county representation
Ocean Township is located in the 4th Congressional District and is part of New Jersey's 11th state legislative district.

 

Monmouth County is governed by a Board of County Commissioners comprised of five members who are elected at-large to serve three year terms of office on a staggered basis, with either one or two seats up for election each year as part of the November general election. At an annual reorganization meeting held in the beginning of January, the board selects one of its members to serve as Director and another as Deputy Director. , Monmouth County's Commissioners are
Commissioner Director Thomas A. Arnone (R, Neptune City, term as commissioner and as director ends December 31, 2022), 
Commissioner Deputy Director Susan M. Kiley (R, Hazlet Township, term as commissioner ends December 31, 2024; term as deputy commissioner director ends 2022),
Lillian G. Burry (R, Colts Neck Township, 2023),
Nick DiRocco (R, Wall Township, 2022), and 
Ross F. Licitra (R, Marlboro Township, 2023). 
Constitutional officers elected on a countywide basis are
County clerk Christine Giordano Hanlon (R, 2025; Ocean Township), 
Sheriff Shaun Golden (R, 2022; Howell Township) and 
Surrogate Rosemarie D. Peters (R, 2026; Middletown Township).

Politics
As of March 2011, there were a total of 18,379 registered voters in Ocean Township, of which 4,936 (26.9%) were registered as Democrats, 3,813 (20.7%) were registered as Republicans and 9,621 (52.3%) were registered as Unaffiliated. There were 9 voters registered as Libertarians or Greens.

In the 2012 presidential election, Democrat Barack Obama received 50.6% of the vote (6,621 cast), ahead of Republican Mitt Romney with 48.3% (6,326 votes), and other candidates with 1.1% (140 votes), among the 13,185 ballots cast by the township's 19,049 registered voters (98 ballots were spoiled), for a turnout of 69.2%. In the 2008 presidential election, Democrat Barack Obama received 50.7% of the vote (7,278 cast), ahead of Republican John McCain with 46.9% (6,737 votes) and other candidates with 0.9% (134 votes), among the 14,364 ballots cast by the township's 19,444 registered voters, for a turnout of 73.9%. In the 2004 presidential election, Republican George W. Bush received 50.3% of the vote (6,941 ballots cast), outpolling Democrat John Kerry with 48.7% (6,721 votes) and other candidates with 0.6% (112 votes), among the 13,791 ballots cast by the township's 18,237 registered voters, for a turnout percentage of 75.6.

In the 2013 gubernatorial election, Republican Chris Christie received 67.6% of the vote (5,335 cast), ahead of Democrat Barbara Buono with 31.1% (2,456 votes), and other candidates with 1.3% (103 votes), among the 7,995 ballots cast by the township's 19,142 registered voters (101 ballots were spoiled), for a turnout of 41.8%. In the 2009 gubernatorial election, Republican Chris Christie received 56.7% of the vote (5,314 ballots cast), ahead of  Democrat Jon Corzine with 35.4% (3,324 votes), Independent Chris Daggett with 6.7% (625 votes) and other candidates with 0.6% (59 votes), among the 9,377 ballots cast by the township's 18,743 registered voters, yielding a 50.0% turnout.

Education
Public school students in pre-kindergarten through twelfth grade in Ocean Township are served by the Ocean Township School District. As of the 2018–19 school year, the district, comprised of five schools, had an enrollment of 3,458 students and 356.2 classroom teachers (on an FTE basis), for a student–teacher ratio of 9.7:1. Schools in the district (with 2018–19 enrollment data from the National Center for Education Statistics) are 
Ocean Township Elementary School (located in Oakhurst; with 403 students, in grades Pre-K–4), 
Wanamassa Elementary School (Wanamassa; 304, K–4), 
Wayside Elementary School (Wayside; 566, Pre-K–4), 
Ocean Township Intermediate School (Wayside; 1,067, 5–8) and 
Ocean Township High School (Oakhurst; 1,070, 9–12)

At the end of the 2016–17 school year, Loch Arbour left the district after receiving approval from the New Jersey Department of Education and following the overwhelming passage of a referendum; with 14 public school students and school property taxes of $2 million, Loch Arbour had been paying an average of $143,000 per pupil, which would be significantly reduced under new sending/receiving relationships established with the West Long Branch Public Schools for Pre-K–8 and Shore Regional High School for 9–12, under which Loch Arbour would pay tuition to each district based on the number of students.

Transportation

Roads and highways 

Ocean Township is accessible by several major roads. The Route 18 freeway traverses the western part while Route 35 passes through in the east. Route 66 runs along the southern border with Neptune and Route 71 straddles the eastern border with Deal and West Long Branch. The Garden State Parkway is located west of Ocean in neighboring Tinton Falls.

Public transportation 
A brief stretch of NJ Transit's North Jersey Coast Line passes through in the east, but the closest stations are Allenhurst and Elberon.

NJ Transit provides local bus transportation on the 832 and 837 routes.

Ferry service is available through the SeaStreak service in Highlands, a trip that involves about a 25–30 minute drive from Ocean Township (depending on the section of town) to reach the departing terminal. SeaStreak offers ferry service to New York City with trips to Pier 11 (on the East River at Wall Street) and East 35th Street in Manhattan. The ferry service also offers seasonal travel, such as to the public beaches on Sandy Hook, baseball games at Yankee Stadium and Citi Field, trips to Broadway matinees, Martha's Vineyard in Massachusetts, college football games at West Point, fall foliage in the Hudson Valley, and to the Macy's Thanksgiving Day Parade, among other excursions.

Notable people

People who were born in, residents of, or otherwise closely associated with Ocean Township include:

 Mary Pat Angelini (born 1954), member of the New Jersey General Assembly from the 11th Legislative District from 2008 to 2016
 Lou Barbaro (1916–1976), professional golfer
 Marie Castello (1915–2008), fortune teller known as Madam Marie who became widely known after being mentioned in Bruce Springsteen's 1973 song "4th of July, Asbury Park (Sandy)"
 Claude Dauphin (1903–1978), French actor
 Michelle Davidson (born 1970), masters swimmer and a long distance, open water swimmer who accomplished the Triple Crown of Open Water Swimming, which includes crossing the English Channel and Catalina Channel, and circumnavigating Manhattan Island
 Bob Davis (born 1945), former NFL quarterback whose career included three seasons with the New York Jets
 Kathleen Dorsett (born 1974), schoolteacher who was convicted of the August 2010 murder of her ex-husband
 Solomon Dwek (born ), real estate investor who became an FBI informant as part of Operation Bid Rig
 Norma Eberhardt (1929–2011), actress whose films included Live Fast, Die Young and The Return of Dracula
 Caroline Elkins (born 1969), Pulitzer Prize-winning historian and Harvard University professor
 Frank J. Esposito (born 1941), historian and college professor who ran as the lieutenant governor running mate of Christopher Daggett in the New Jersey gubernatorial election, 2009
 Edward J. Hart (1893–1961), represented , 1935–1955
 Trent Hindman (born 1995), racing driver who won the 2014 Continental Tire Sports Car Challenge in the GS class
 Stephen L. Hoffman (born 1948), physician-scientist, tropical medicine specialist and vaccinologist.
 Rowland Hughes (1896–1957), Director of the Office of Management and Budget, 1954–1956
 Oren Liebermann, journalist who works as the Jerusalem correspondent for CNN
 Chris Malachowsky (born ), electrical engineer who was a founder of the computer graphics company Nvidia
 Gloria Monty (1921–2006), television producer best known for her work in the field of soap operas, most notably her tenure at General Hospital
 Eric Nies (born 1971), actor, male fashion model, dancer, and singer, best known for being a cast member in the first season of MTV's The Real World
 Jack Nies (born 1937), retired National Basketball Association referee
 John Nies (born 1967), former NFL punter for the Buffalo Bills
 Joseph A. Palaia (1927–2016), member of the New Jersey General Assembly, 1982–1989; member of the New Jersey Senate, 1989–2008
 Kenny Pickett (born 1998), American football quarterback who was drafted by the Pittsburgh Steelers
 Sally Priesand (born 1946), first woman ordained by a rabbinical seminary in the United States
 Adam Sarafian (born 1986), national champion pole vaulter in 2004
 Bruce Springsteen (born 1949), musician<ref>Gambaccini, Peter. [https://books.google.com/books?id=uf45AQAAIAAJ&q=%22ocean+township%22 "Bruce Springsteen], p. 71. Perigee Books, 1985. . Accessed July 24, 2014. "Carl 'Tinker' West, owner of a surfboard factory in Ocean Township, let Bruce live upstairs over the factory in 1970, and in that same year drove Springsteen to California for a gig that paid $2,200."</ref>
 Richard R. Stout (1912–1986), politician who served in the New Jersey Senate from 1952 to 1974
 Ashley Tisdale (born 1985), actress, Disney's The Suite Life of Zack & Cody and High School Musical Lew Tucker (born 1950), computer scientist, open source advocate and industry executive
 Tommy Tucker (1903–1989), bandleader best known for "I Don't Want to Set the World on Fire"
 Jeffrey K. Tulis (born 1950), political scientist known for work that conjoins the fields of American politics, political theory, and public law.
 Michael Uslan (born 1951), originator and executive producer of the Batman movies
 John Villapiano (born 1951), former professional football player who played in the World Football League; politician who served on the Monmouth County, New Jersey Board of chosen freeholders and the New Jersey General Assembly
 Phil Villapiano (born 1949), NFL linebacker who played for the Oakland Raiders
 Brett Wigdortz (born 1973), founder and CEO of Teach First
 Wendy Williams (born 1964), talk show host and author host of The Wendy Williams Show''

References

External links

Ocean Township official website
Ocean Township School District

School Data for the Ocean Township School District, National Center for Education Statistics

 
1849 establishments in New Jersey
Faulkner Act (council–manager)
Populated places established in 1849
Townships in Monmouth County, New Jersey